CJBC-FM is a public Canadian radio station, broadcasting at 90.3 MHz in Toronto, Ontario. A French-language station, it airs the programming of Radio-Canada's Ici Musique network. CJBC's studios are located in the Canadian Broadcasting Centre, while its transmitter is located atop First Canadian Place in Toronto's Financial District.

The station launched in 1992. It is a sister station to CJBC, which is part of the Ici Radio-Canada Première network.

In December 2017, CJBC-FM added an HD Radio feed to broadcast high-quality digital radio signals throughout much of Toronto. CJBC-FM has retransmitters in Windsor and Paris (Kitchener/Waterloo).

Programming
As a part of the Ici Musique network, CJBC-FM mainly broadcasts the same programs as the rest of the network. However, the station simulcasts the local Ici Première morning and afternoon drive time programs Y'a pas deux matins pareils and L'heure de pointe.  The morning show has been simulcast since 2004 and the afternoon show since 2020.

Transmitters

References

External links
ICI Musique 
 

Jbc
Jbc
Jbc
Radio stations established in 1992
1992 establishments in Ontario
HD Radio stations